Fallingwater is Lisa Miskovsky's second album, and was released in Sweden on 22 October 2003 and in the UK on 13 June 2005. It was her first to reach number one on the Swedish charts, which happened on 31 October 2003.

Track listing

Bonus tracks 
 Shells (Berg/Miskovsky)
 Please Forgive Me (Berg Miskovsky)

Singles 
 Lady Stardust
 Sing to Me
 A Brand New Day

Charts

Weekly charts

Year-end charts

References

2005 albums
Lisa Miskovsky albums